Muflihi, Muflahi, Muflihi or the Muflahi Sheikhdom, was a state in the British Aden Protectorate.
Its last sheikh, Kassim Abdulrahaman Al-Muflihi, was deposed in 1967 upon the founding of the People's Republic of South Yemen and the area is now part of the Republic of Yemen.

History
Muflihi was originally one of the five sheikhdoms of Upper Yafa but joined the Federation of South Arabia and its successor, the Federation of South Arabia, as a separate state.
Although most of the Al Muflahi family members still reside in Yemen, some members of the family migrated north of the Arabian peninsula in the early 1960s by settling into countries such as Saudi Arabia, Kuwait, United Arab Emirates and Qatar. Recently, many have moved to western countries as well, including the United Kingdom in areas such as Birmingham and the United States of America; in the latter they live predominantly in the Metro Detroit area.

Sheikhs

 1850 – 1885                al-Qasim al-Sakkaf
 1885 – 1920                `Abd al-Rahman ibn al-Qasim al-Sakkaf
 1920 – 12 August 1967         al-Qasim ibn `Abd al-Rahman
 1967 – 2000                 Nasir ibn al-Sakkaf
 2000 – Present               `Yahya Abdullah Kahtan

See also
Aden Protectorate
Upper Yafa

References

External links
Map of Arabia (1905-1923) including the states of Aden Protectorate

States in the Aden Protectorate
Federation of South Arabia
Former monarchies of Asia